Michail Powell (born 11 June 1991) is a Jamaican cricketer. He made his List A debut on 22 November 2019, for Combined Campuses and Colleges in the 2019–20 Regional Super50 tournament.

References

External links
 

1991 births
Living people
Jamaican cricketers
Combined Campuses and Colleges cricketers
Place of birth missing (living people)